Lena Endre (born 8 July 1955) is a Swedish actress of film and television, primarily in the Swedish and Norwegian markets, known for her parts in the Liv Ullmann film Trolösa (2000), and the Millennium series of films (e.g., The Girl with the Dragon Tattoo), based on the eponymous trio of Stieg Larsson books. Endre made her English-language debut in 2012, in Paul Thomas Anderson's movie The Master, starring Joaquin Phoenix and Philip Seymour Hoffman.

Early life
Endre was born in Lidingö, Stockholm County to Beryl (née Forsman) and Ants Endre and she has two brothers, she grew up in Härnösand, Ångermanland, and Trollbäcken, Tyresö. Initially, she was studying marine biology before dropping out to work at a record store; she participated in amateur theater during this time. She acted as a part of the Teater Sputnik and Inge Waern's Theatre Studio theater groups in 1979. In 1983, she was accepted to the Stockholm Academy of the Performing Arts.

Career
Endre graduated Stockholm Academy of the Performing Arts in 1986 and had her breakthrough in the Swedish television series The Department Store and Lorry in the 1980s. She left the cast of The Department Store after identifying too closely with her character. Endre was hired by the Royal Dramatic Theatre in 1987. Prior to her role on The Department Store, she had a small part in the film The Inside Man in 1984.

Since then she has acted in a number of television and film productions, primarily in Sweden and Norway.

She is known for her part in the Liv Ullmann film Trolösa (2000), as well as her role as Katarina, the love interest for Wallander in the second TV series of that name. Endre also appeared in two films by Danish director Simon Staho, Dag och Natt (2004) and Himlens Hjärta (2008), for which she was nominated as Best Leading Actress at the Swedish film awards, "Guldbagge". More recently, Endre dramatized the character "Erika Berger," editor of the fictional investigative periodical Millenium in the trilogy  of films—The Girl with the Dragon Tattoo, The Girl Who Played with Fire, and The Girl Who Kicked the Hornets' Nest (all 2009)—based on the eponymous trio of Stieg Larsson books.

Endre made her English-language debut in Paul Thomas Anderson's movie The Master, alongside Joaquin Phoenix, Philip Seymour Hoffman, Amy Adams, and Laura Dern.

Awards
Lena Endre received a "Guldbagge" (Swedish film award) for Best Actress in a Supporting Role in 1997 and for Best Actress in a Leading Role in 2000, and was a host of the same awards in 2006.

Filmography

Further reading
 Terry Keefe, 2012, "Talking Limbo with The Girl with the Dragon Tattoo's Lena Endre," The Hollywood Interview (online), November 19, 2012, see , accessed 13 June 2015.
 Anon., 2012, "Collaborators, Actress: Lena Endre," at Ingmar Bergman Foundation, May 17, 2012, see , accessed 12 June 2015.

References

External links

Lena Endre at the Swedish Film Database. (Swedish)

1955 births
Living people
Swedish film actresses
Swedish television actresses
Eugene O'Neill Award winners
Litteris et Artibus recipients
People from Härnösand
Best Actress Guldbagge Award winners
Best Supporting Actress Guldbagge Award winners
20th-century Swedish actresses
21st-century Swedish actresses